Gilbert C. Gee is a professor in the Department of Community Health Sciences in the Fielding School of Public Health at the University of California, Los Angeles. He is known for researching the effects of racial discrimination on mental and physical health. He was appointed editor-in-chief of the Journal of Health and Social Behavior in 2013. Gee and his colleague Chandra Ford were awarded the 2019 Paul Cornely Award for their work on how health is affected by racism.

References

External links
Faculty page

Living people
UCLA School of Public Health faculty
Oberlin College alumni
Johns Hopkins University alumni
Academic journal editors
American sociologists
American public health doctors
Year of birth missing (living people)